Snip.it was a social platform for creating collections of articles, videos, and images on the web. Users create and maintain theme-based collections around interests such as politics, science, education, and fashion. Users can browse other collections, 'resnip' from another users collection into their own, comment on or favorite a snip, share on other social media platforms (Twitter, Facebook, Google+, and Reddit), and review stats on where their page traffic comes from.

Founded by Ramy Adeeb (of Cairo, Egypt), the site is managed by a team of 6 engineers and funded by True and Khosla Ventures as well as several other prominent investors.

On January 22, 2013, Yahoo! acquired Snip.it for an amount of $10 million in total. Snip.it have stopped their services temporarily in order to redesign the site. By March 2013, the site suspended all snipping. By August 2014, the site's url permanently redirected to Yahoo Tech.

Technical
Snip.it's backend is written in Ruby on Rails, Backbone.js and Node.js

References

External links 
 

American social networking websites
2013 mergers and acquisitions
Internet properties established in 2011
Internet properties disestablished in 2014
Defunct social networking services
Yahoo! acquisitions